Rehabari is a locality of Guwahati. It is surrounded by localities of Paltan Bazaar and Athgaon.

Transport
Rehabari lies near the regional transportation hub of Paltan Bazar and is well connected to the rest of the city.

See also
 Rupnagar
 Paltan Bazaar

References

Neighbourhoods in Guwahati